William John Macdonald (29 November 1832 – 25 October 1916) was a Canadian merchant and politician. He migrated from the UK to the then separate colony of Vancouver Island aboard the Tory, a seven-month voyage from 1850 to 1851. He had been engaged as a clerk for the Hudson's Bay Company which at that time ruled Vancouver Island under a grant from the British. He served as mayor of Victoria, British Columbia, in 1866, 1867 and 1871.

A Conservative, he was appointed to the Senate of Canada on 13 December 1871 on the recommendation of Sir John A. Macdonald. He represented the senatorial division of Victoria until his resignation on 13 April 1915.

External links 
 

1832 births
1916 deaths
Canadian senators from British Columbia
Conservative Party of Canada (1867–1942) senators
Mayors of Victoria, British Columbia